Odontophrynus is a genus of frogs in the family Odontophrynidae. They are found in southern and eastern South America. They are sometimes known as the escuerzos.

Species
The genus contains the following species:

 Odontophrynus americanus (Duméril and Bibron, 1841)
 Odontophrynus carvalhoi Savage and Cei, 1965
 Odontophrynus cordobae Martino and Sinsch, 2002
 Odontophrynus cultripes Reinhardt and Lütken, 1862
Odontophrynus juquinha Rocha, Sena, Pezzuti, Leite, Svartman, Rosset, Baldo, and Garcia, 2017
 Odontophrynus lavillai Cei, 1985
 Odontophrynus maisuma Rosset, 2008
 Odontophrynus monachus Caramaschi and Napoli, 2012
 Odontophrynus occidentalis (Berg, 1896)
Odontophrynus reigi Rosset, Fadel, Guimarães, Carvalho, Ceron, Pedrozo, Serejo, Souza, Baldo, and Mângia, 2021

References

 
Odontophrynidae
Amphibian genera
Amphibians of South America
Taxa named by Christian Frederik Lütken
Taxa named by Johannes Theodor Reinhardt
Taxonomy articles created by Polbot